Athena SWAN (Scientific Women's Academic Network) is a equality charter mark framework and accreditation scheme established and managed by the UK Equality Challenge Unit (now part of Advance HE) in 2005 that recognises and celebrates good practices in higher education and research institutions towards the advancement of gender equality: representation, progression and success.

History 
The Athena SWAN charter was established in 2005 and the first awards were conferred in 2006. The initial charter set out to encourage and recognise commitment to advancing the careers of women in science, technology, engineering, mathematics, and medicine (STEMM) institutions of higher education and research. In 2011, the UK Chief Medical Officer made it a requirement for academic departments applying for funding from the English National Institution of Health Research to hold the Athena SWAN silver award.

In May 2015 the charter was expanded to include non-STEMM departments including arts, humanities, social sciences, business, and law. Additionally, it expanded to cover additional communities including professional and support staff, technical staff, as well as transgender staff and students. The first awards to non-STEMM university departments were announced in April 2016. The new charter recognises work undertaken to address gender equality more broadly, and not just barriers to progression that affect women.

Award details 
Members (universities) who sign up to the charter are expected to apply for an Athena SWAN award, at Bronze, Silver or Gold level. Each award is valid for four years under the post-2015 rules (three years where pre-2015 rules apply).

They commit to adopting ten principles, which focus on promoting and supporting gender equality for women. These are:

The ten principles have been criticised for failing to mention collective bargaining, for failing to address unconscious bias in paying "market" rates of pay, and failing to address the sex discrimination inherent in child care rights to paid leave and the lasting negative impact this has on relative career advancement for those taking long maternity and short paternity leave. It has also been found that "there is no evidence that Athena SWAN membership and award level have any impact" on "the gender pay gap and the proportion of women in the top quartile of pay".

Reception 
An exploratory study of women's and men's perceptions of Athena SWAN in 2017 was broadly positive, and highlighted the significance of government funding being linked to Athena SWAN awards; it also highlighted the limitations of the process to change long-standing and entrenched issues in society. A 2019 study of the university culture in medical and social sciences attributed a more positive culture in medical sciences to the widespread implementation of Athena SWAN gender equality action plans, linked to the funding incentives of the National Institute for Health Research (NIHR). A 2020 study examining the effect of Athena SWAN funding incentives on women's research leadership in NIHR Biomedical Research Centres found a rise in the number of women in mid-level leadership positions and the proportion of funding going to women.

According to empirical research carried out at the University of Bath, "there is no evidence that Athena SWAN membership and award level have any impact" on "the gender pay gap and the proportion of women in the top quartile of pay". Some commentators consider it to be largely window-dressing with little impact on lived experiences of women working in universities.

The Athena SWAN charter is now used  by some institutions in conjunction with the Race Equality charter and issues of gender and race inequality become conflated.

In November 2021, The Times reported concerns about the Athena SWAN programme; barrister Naomi Cunningham described it as "totalitarian and unlawful" while historian Selina Todd, in a letter to the editor, said it "promotes a controversial view of sex and gender". It has been suggested that institutional commitment to the charter poses a risk to academic freedom.

International

Australia 
An Australian pilot of the Charter began in 2015 and is overseen by SAGE Ltd., a not-for-profit company created from a partnership of the Australian Academy of Science and the Australian Academy of Technology and Engineering.

Ireland 
In 2015 the Charter entered Irish higher education. It is supported by the Athena SWAN National Committee which has representatives from higher education institutes, Advance HE, the Higher Education Authority, Irish research agencies, the Irish Universities Association and the Technological Higher Education Association. As of December 2022, there was a total of 112 award holders, 110 of these were Bronze Awards and the remainder were Silver.

Influence 
Despite being in its nascent stage, research into the effects of the Charter on the careers of women indicates a positive impact on gender diversity among both managerial leaders and non-managerial academics, as well as female research leaders. The latter is attributed to the introduction of Athena SWAN research funding incentives, which promote research and leadership opportunities for women. However, it is important to note that these improvements are not ubiquitous across all academic disciplines, and Charter-induced interventions may take some time to produce tangible results, as the influence of diversity charters follows a trajectory of maturity.

USA 
In 2017 Advance HE supported the American Association for the Advancement of Science in introducing a pilot called STEM Equity Achievement (SEA) Change programme. SEA Change borrows from Athena SWAN but is broader in scope.

Canada 
In 2018 Canada introduced the Dimensions pilot programme. Supported by Advance HE, Dimensions aims to draw on the Athena SWAN methodology to recognise institutions that are inclusive of underrepresented groups.

See also
Equal opportunity
Gender equality
Gender inequality
Gender studies
Women's empowerment 
UK labour law

References

External links

Gender equality
Women in science and technology
Accreditation
Higher education in the United Kingdom
Higher education in Australia